The Agfa Optima Flash is a fixed-lens 35 mm viewfinder camera manufactured in Germany by Agfa from 1981 to 1983. It belongs to the Agfa Optima series, features the same big red Sensor shutter-release and large viewfinder as any other in the series, with some improvements and a built-in flash.

Specifications
 Lens: Agfa Solitar 40mm f2.8; four elements in three groups
 Focus: Manual 0.9m to infinity scale-focus
 Shutter: 2-bladed leaf-shutter
 Shutter speed: 1/45s – 1/1000s automatic
 Aperture: f2.8 – f22 automatic
 Exposure mode: Programmed automatic
 Exposure sensor: Twin CdS cells
 Viewfinder: Bright-line type
 Flash: Integral – manually raised when required
 Flash Guide Number: 12 ASA 100
 Filter size: 49mm
 Film type: 135 film
 Film speed range: ASA 25 – 500
 Film advance: Manual – lever-wind
 Film rewind: Manual – uses same lever as film-advance (rewind-mode selected via dedicated button)
 Battery: Two 1.5 Volt type AAA
 Size: 122 x 85 x 68 mm when folded, 122 x 119 x 68 mm with flash open (w h d)
 Weight: 329 gram
 Self-timer: No
 Tripod mount: Yes

External links
The family of the Agfa Optima sensor electronic The Agfa optima flash sensor

135 film cameras
Agfa cameras